Alpha 1,3-galactosyltransferase 2 is a protein that in humans is encoded by the A3GALT2 gene.

References

Further reading